Virtopsy is a virtual alternative to a traditional autopsy, conducted with scanning and imaging technology. The name is a portmanteau of "virtual" and "autopsy" and is a trademark registered to Richard Dirnhofer (de), the former head of the Institute of Forensic Medicine of the University of Bern, Switzerland.

The term “virtual” in this context apparently is meant in both the modern and original senses. Virtual's Latin root word “virtus” (virtue) implies the qualities of capability, efficiency, effectiveness and objectivity. However, some proponents propose to replace traditional autopsy with this approach. "Virtual" also has the sense of "digital" or refers to virtual reality respectively.

Based on Dirnhofer's claim, Virtopsy fully satisfies the requirement that medical forensic findings provide “a complete and true picture of the object examined”. Furthermore, Virtopsy also achieves the objective “that the pathologist’s report should ‘photograph’ with words so that the reader is able to follow his thoughts visually”.

Concept

Forensic pathology is a field within which physicians are mainly preoccupied with examining what initially are victims of possible, suspected or obvious violence that ultimately die. Clinical forensic medicine essentially does the same but with living victims; traffic medicine and age determination are applications that are not, strictly speaking, restricted to clinical forensic medicine in that general practitioners, pediatricians, and other specialists also provide services for such requests.

As examinations typically are performed under the legal and task restraints of investigative authorities such as courts, prosecutors, district attorneys or police, there are constraints as to cost, time, objectivity and task specification depending on local law.

The most relevant step is adequately documenting findings. Virtopsy employs imaging methods that are also used in clinical medicine such as computed tomography (CT), magnetic resonance imaging (MRI). Also, 3D surface scanning typically used in automotive industry is being employed to integrate body surface documentation with 3D scene or tool scans. The choice of methods is further supplemented with 3D imaging-guided biopsy systems and post mortem angiography.

CT is well suited to show foreign objects, bone and air or gas distribution throughout the body, whereas MRI sequences are strong in detailing organ and soft tissue findings. A comprehensive analysis of both surface and deep tissue findings may require fusion of CT, MRI and 3D surface data.

Resulting data can be archived and reproduced without loss, analysed elsewhere, or distributed to specialists for technically demanding analysis.

Autopsy still produces both different and ancillary findings compared to Virtopsy results so that currently, Virtopsy is not a generally accepted method to entirely replace autopsies. In fact, the first scientific study detailing the results of comparing postmortem CT scanning with conventional autopsies was conducted by a team from Israel and was published 1994. Their conclusion already had been that single methods were not as useful to maximize on yielding as many findings as possible as the combination of scanning and autopsy were.

Terms

The term “Virtobot” is a trademark also registered to Prof. R. Dirnhofer. It describes a multi-functional robotic system.

The Virtangio machine is a device that is trademarked to Prof. R. Dirnhofer  and manufactured by Fumedica .

Usage of Greek words in the context of examining deaths may not withstand the test of falsification that spearheaded the Virtopsy idea to begin with, but, in fact, usage of existing and creation of new neologisms may have to be reconsidered.

Operative aspects

The Virtopsy project started as a research project that was initiated at the end of the twentieth century by Prof. Richard Dirnhofer, and now covers both applied methods and research. Virtopsy contains applied research into various methods of high-tech imaging with the goal to introduce them into the practice of forensic pathology.

With Prof. Michael Thali as operative head of the group, the Virtopsy research team operates out of the Institute of Forensic Medicine at the University of Zurich, Switzerland since early 2011.

Examination of death

The idea to conduct virtual autopsy is not new. In 2003, the British Museum contacted the University of Bern's Institute of Forensic Medicine in Switzerland for their Virtopsy to do autopsy on a 3000-year-old mummy named Nesperennub without compromising the body. While manner of death, cause of death, time of death, identification of deceased and a range of practical and reconstructive applications are obviously related to medicolegal investigation of death, Virtopsy methods were ground breaking in that they have established a new high-tech toolbox into both research and practice morphological investigation aspects of modern forensic pathology.

Since virtopsy is non-invasive, it is less traumatic for surviving family members and may not violate religious taboos against violating bodily integrity.

Examination of the living

Non-invasive imaging is also conducted in living or surviving subjects, but as that has been the main clinical application of CT and MR imaging to begin with, their use in medicolegal investigation of the living is not as ground breaking as using them for investigation of death. Nevertheless, a number of applications that may be regarded as specific for medicolegal imaging applications in the living have found attraction for Virtopsy-derived methods:

 Matching weapon or injury-causing agent and injury. The application of 3D surface documentation of injuries for the benefit of medicolegal reconstruction must be accredited to Brueschweiler et al. (2003).
 Strangulation and estimation of risk of death. The first paper documenting systematic application of MRI to survivors of strangulation for the benefit of forensic medicine was published by Yen et al. in 2005.
 Body packing. According to a paper of the Virtopsy group, CT scanning may be more suitable to body packer identification than conventional or plain abdominal X-rays.

Technology 

The technology currently used for conducting a “virtual autopsy” comprises

 Robot-guided surface scanning for three-dimensional documentation of the surface of the body, to scale and in color. This supplements the external postmortem examination of the body" that is done in a conventional autopsy;
 Multislice spiral CT and MRI for visualising the body in 3D. This supplements the internal postmortem examination of the body in an autopsy;
 Post mortem angiography, which visualises the cardiovascular system of the deceased with the aid of a peristaltic pump and contrast medium;
 Image- and robot-guided, contamination-free sampling for a wide range of supplementary forensic analyses, such as histology, bacteriology, virology, toxicology and diatomology. This procedure replaces the usual collection and storage of sample material from the body.

Virtopsy objectives 

The Virtopsy idea was generated to yield results along a comprehensive number of performance indicators:

 The practical objective of both research and application of Virtopsy methods are to improve the objectivity of findings made in forensic autopsies.
 The academic objective of Virtopsy research is to publish original and validation type research.
 Last but not the least, financial gains are also a relevant aspect of new technology particularly in the private industry sector whereas saving cost is an aspect for public institutes or offices.

Success

Virtopsy methods have helped to solve a range of cases that would have been difficult or impossible to solve otherwise. While academically, case-reports tend to be looked down on by medical faculty, they can expand the existing experience by significant contributions.

Advantages 
This method offers the following advantages:

 Preservation of the body in a virtual form.
 Observer-independent documentation of the evidence – "delegation of seeing to the machine".
 Complete, non-destructive gathering of findings from head to toe
 Data acquisition in parts of the body that otherwise would not be examined out of respect for the deceased (e.g. the face).
 Data acquisition in regions that are difficult to dissect and access (e.g. atlanto-occipital joints), and in cases of advanced decomposition.
 Visualization of the cardiovascular system.
 Replacement of manual dexterity by the "virtual knife" of the automatic sectional imaging technique.
 Standardized data acquisition procedure.
 High-precision, contamination-free sampling (poisons, infections, tissue, etc.) accurate to the millimeter. 
 True-to-scale 3D documentation for precise forensic reconstructions.
 Clean, bloodless visualization of the documentation.
 Improvement in the quality of forensic reports – simultaneous examination by different experts via tele-forensics.
 Simplification of the assessment of evidence by improved comprehensibility of the visual 3D findings.
 Acceptance by relatives and religious communities over conventional autopsies.
 The complete saved data-set can be re-examined at any time if a second expert opinion is required, even after burial or cremation of the body.
 Rapid and complete data acquisition as part of analyses following disasters (terrorist attacks, plane crashes, etc.).

Disadvantages 
 High equipment costs
 The limitations for radiology apply:
 Metal foreign objects
 One cannot determine the color of internal organs and color changes
 One cannot determine all the pathological conditions (e.g. inflammation)
 One cannot determine the infection status of tissue
 It is difficult to differentiate antemortem from postmortem wounds and postmortem artifacts
 Small tissue injuries may be overlooked
 The limitations for surface scanning apply:
 Recording concave features, out of view
 Turning the body over for total body recording can alter the body shape due to gravity (e.g. stomach) which may disturb the merging of recorded surfaces
 Recording reflective or transparent surfaces (e.g. the eye) 
 Merging data from multiple techniques will always result in some loss of precision
 A reliance on imagery alone may lead to omissions (e.g. bruising under the scalp not visible with surface scanning)
 Validity
 No proper validation of the method has been made using closely prepared prospective studies
 No error rate available
 No juridical validity (yet)
 As applicable to all simulated evidence presented in the court room, there are concerns of suggestiveness
 Objectivity
 It has not been investigated whether experts are consistent in their judgment
 Context effects (e.g.  post-hoc target shifting in cases in which injury patterns are compared to possible injury-causing objects)

Best practice 
The National Research Council in the USA, as part of its proposals for reforms in the forensic sciences, has proposed Virtopsy as “Best Practice” for the gathering of forensic evidence [www.ncjrs.gov/pdffiles1/nij/grants/228091.pdf].

In addition, the International Society of Forensic Radiology and Imaging was founded in 2012 with the aim of enabling a continuous exchange of research results among its members and developing quality standards for the techniques employed .

A Technical Working Group Forensic Imaging Methods  was founded in 2005 by Michael Thali and Richard Dirnhofer. It aims to promote an increasingly internationally standardised approach.

Furthermore, a TTechnical Working Group Postmortem Angiography Methods was founded in 2012 to promote best practice. Under the direction of the University Hospital of Lausanne and comprising nine European institutes of forensic medicine, it is developing reliable, standardized methods and guidelines for conducting and assessing postmortem angiographic examinations [www.postmortem-angio.ch].

Virtopsy project leading house
 Universität Zürich Institut für Rechtsmedizin
 The virtopsy website at the Institute of Forensic Medicine  at the University of Zurich

Institutes contributing to the Virtopsy project
 Institut für Rechtsmedizin der Universität Basel
 Charité Berlin, Institut für Rechtsmedizin
 University of Bern, Institut für Rechtsmedizin
 Centre universitaire romand de médecine légale, Lausanne - Genève (CURML)

Institutes, districts or countries conducting post-mortem scanning
 India- Department of Forensic Medicine and Toxicology, All India Institute of Medical Sciences- New Delhi 
 Japan - Autopsy Imaging  
 Australia - Melbourne - VIFM 
 Europe - Denmark - Odense - Institute of Forensic Medicine, University of Southern Denmark 
 United States - State of Maryland Medical Examiner

Films 
 The Virtopsy Process
 The Virtopsy Table
 Virtual Autopsy Table

Books and journals 
 Brogdons's Forensic Radiology, 2nd Edition  Michael J. Thali, Mark D. Viner, Byron Gil Brogdon, 2011 CRC Press
 The Virtopsy Approach: 3D Optical and Radiological Scanning and Reconstruction in Forensic Medicine Michael J. Thali, Richard Dirnhofer, Peter Vock, 2009 CRC Press
 Entwicklung des Systems, Interview mit Thali
 Virtopsy – Obduktion neu in Bildern; Dirnhofer/Schick/Ranner, Schriftenreihe Recht der Medizin, 2010 Manz
 Revolution in der Gerichtsmedizin erschienen in „Öffentliche Sicherheit 9-10/09
 Die Virtopsie wird die Autopsie ablösen Erschienen in Kriminalpolizei Oktober/November 2009

Virtopsies in popular culture 

 In the CSI: Miami episode "Deep Freeze", Dr. Woods performs a virtopsy on a recently murdered athlete to prevent damaging him so that he could be cryogenically frozen.
 In the CSI: NY episode "Veritas", Sid does a virtual autopsy on Derek, showing Stella that the bullet that killed him entered through his cheek.

References

External links 
 Strengthening Forensic science in the USA
 National Research Council
 An article  on virtopsies by Popular Science
 An article on virtopsies by the  New York Times

X-ray computed tomography